Ok Ye-rin (Korean: 옥예린; born on 14 December 2011) is a South Korean child actress. She made her acting debut in 2017, since then, she has appeared in number of films and television series. She is known for her various roles as child actor as: My Secret Terrius (2018) and Itaewon Class (2020). She has acted in films also such as: Champion and Man of Men (2018) among others. In 2022 she appeared in romantic TV series Twenty-Five Twenty-One.

Career
In 2018, she won the Best Young Actress award at 2018 MBC Drama Awards for her role of Cha Joon-hee in mystery drama My Secret Terrius.
 
Ok Ye-rin participated at the 'One K Concert for the 100th Anniversary of the March 1st Movement' held at the National Assembly in Yeouido, Seoul on March 1, 2019 and sang "Where the Wind Blows".

Filmography

Films

Television series

Awards and nominations

References

External links
 
 Ok Ye-rin on Daum 

Living people
2011 births
South Korean child actresses
Actresses from Seoul
21st-century South Korean actresses
South Korean film actresses
South Korean television actresses